The women's 200 metres event at the 1959 Summer Universiade was held at the Stadio Comunale di Torino in Turin on 5 and 6 September 1959.

Medalists

Results

Heats

Final

References

Athletics at the 1959 Summer Universiade
1959